Latebraria amphipyroides is a species of moth in the family Erebidae. The species is found in southern North America and Central America, south at least to Cuba and Costa Rica.

References
Latebraria amphipyroides, Moth Photographers' Group
Latebraria amphipyroides, BugGuide

Thermesiini